Chaotic, part of the Women of the Otherworld series, is a novella written by Kelley Armstrong.  It was published in an anthology of supernatural-themed novellas, called "Dates From Hell."  This novella takes place between Haunted and Broken in the Women of the Otherworld series.

Plot summary
Half-demon Hope Adams loves her job. Granted, working for True News tabloid isn't quite the career her high-society family had in mind for her. What they don't know is that the tabloid job is just a cover, a way for her to investigate stories with a paranormal twist, and help protect the supernatural world from exposure. When Hope's “handler” sends her and a date to a museum charity gala, Hope suspects there's more to it than a free perk. He's tested her before. This time, she's ready for whatever he throws her way. Or so she thinks...until she meets her target: werewolf thief, Karl Marsten...

Characters
Karl Marsten - werewolf and professional thief.
Hope Adams - half-demon and tabloid writer.

Footnotes

American novellas
American fantasy novels
2006 American novels
Werewolf novels
Viking Press books